Georg Weissel (1590 – 1 August 1635) was a German Lutheran minister and hymn writer.

Born in Domnau in Ducal Prussia, a vassal of the Polish–Lithuanian Commonwealth. Weissel studied theology and music at the University of Königsberg, with the musicians Johann Eccard and Johann Stobäus, among others. After working as a rector in Friedland, he was ordained as minister of the Altrossgarten Church in Königsberg on the second Sunday in Advent 1623.

Weissel died in Königsberg.

23 of his songs, written following the rules of Opitz, are extant. His most popular hymn was written on the occasion of the inauguration of the Altrossgarten Church in 1623. The Advent hymn "Macht hoch die Tür", paraphrasing Psalm 24, begins the current Protestant hymnal Evangelisches Gesangbuch (EG). It is now present in most Christian hymnal including the Catholic Gotteslob (GL 218). The current Protestant hymnal has two more of his hymns, "" (EG 113) and "" (EG 346), which he wrote on the occasion of his ordination in Königsberg.

Catherine Winkworth translated the Advent hymn in 1853 as "Lift up your heads, ye mighty gates". Johann Sebastian Bach used Weissel's hymn "" in Part V of his Christmas Oratorio.

References

Literature 
 Johannes Block: Georg Weissel. In: Wolfgang Herbst (ed.):  Göttingen 1999
 
 Werner Krause: . Verlag der  St. Johannis-Druckerei, Lahr-Dinglingen 1900 (4th edition. 2004). .

German Protestant hymnwriters
German Lutherans
Clergy from Königsberg
1590 births
1635 deaths